James West (born 15 September 1982) is a Bermudian cricketer.  West is a right-handed batsman who bowls right-arm medium-fast.  He was born in Bermuda.

West made his debut for Bermuda in a List A match against Namibia at the Wanderers Cricket Ground, Windhoek.  He later made his second List A appearance against the touring United Arab Emirates at the National Stadium, Hamilton.  Following the match against the United Arab Emirates, West played a single Twenty20 match against the same opposition, taking the wicket of Amjad Javed for the cost of 37 runs from three overs.

He was later a part of Bermuda's squad for the 2011 World Cricket League Division Two in the United Arab Emirates, featuring in a single List A match against Uganda.

References

External links

1982 births
Living people
Bermudian cricketers